Jujubinus montagui is a species of sea snail, a marine gastropod mollusk in the family Trochidae, the top snails.

Description
The size of the shell varies between 3 mm and 9 mm. The imperforate or very minutely perforate shell has a conical. The 7 whorls are a little convex. The earlier buff, following pale buffish-ashen, is ornamented with obscure maculations or zones of chestnut. The shell is obliquely striate, spirally lirate with 6 subequal lirae on the penultimate whorl. The body whorl is a little convex above, carinated in the middle, convex beneath and provided with 7–8 concentric, white-and-brown articulated lirae. The aperture is rhomboid. The columella is subtruncate below.

Distribution
This species occurs in the North Sea, the North Atlantic Ocean (from Scotland to Madeira) and in the Mediterranean Sea.

References

 Wood W., 1828: Supplement to the Index Testaceologicus or a catalogue of shells, British and foreign; London, privately published, pp. VI + 59 + 8 pl
 Philippi R. A., 1844: Enumeratio molluscorum Siciliae cum viventium tum in tellure tertiaria fossilium, quae in itinere suo observavit. Vol. 2; Eduard Anton, Halle [Halis Saxorum] iv + 303 p., pl. 13–28 
 Nardo D., 1847: Sinonimia moderna delle specie registrate nell’opera intitolata: Descrizione de’Crostacei, de’Testacei e de’Pesci che abitano le Lagune e Golfo Veneto, rappresentati in figure, a chiaroscuro ed a colori dall' Abate Stefano Chiereghini Ven. Clodiense applicata per commissione governativa
Venezia; pp. i–xi, 1–127
 Réquien E., 1848: Catalogue des Coquilles de l'Île de Corse; Seguin, Avignon V-XII, 13–109
 Jeffreys J. G., 1862–1869: British Conchology; London, van Voorst, Vol. 1: pp. CXIV + 341 [1862]. Vol. 2: pp. 479 [1864] Il frontrespizio reca la data 1863 ma in effetti pubblicato nel 1864. Vol. 3: pp. 394 [1865]. Vol. 4: pp. 487 [1867]. Vol. 5: pp. 259 [1869] 
 Ghisotti F. & Melone G., 1969–1975: Catalogo illustrato delle conchiglie marine del Mediterraneo; Conchiglie Part 1: suppl. 5 (11–12): 1–28 [1969]. Part 2: suppl. 6 (3–4): 29–46 [1970]. Part 3: suppl. 7 (1–2): 47–77 [1971]. Part 4. suppl. 8 (11–12): 79–144 [1972]. Part 5. suppl. 11 (11–12): 147–208 [1975]
 Gofas, S.; Le Renard, J.; Bouchet, P. (2001). Mollusca, in: Costello, M.J. et al. (Ed.) (2001). European register of marine species: a check-list of the marine species in Europe and a bibliography of guides to their identification. Collection Patrimoines Naturels, 50: pp. 180–213

External links
 

montagui
Gastropods described in 1828